Jacqueline Lourdes Blanco-Davao (born February 11, 1964) is a Filipino actress and aerobic instructor. During the 1980s and the 1990s, she appeared in different film genres including  Hihintayin Kita sa Langit, (1991), Si Aida, Si Lorna, o Si Fe, (1989) Misis mo, Misis ko, (1988) and Palabra de honor (1983).

Blanco is the daughter of famous Filipino Music composer and actress Pilita Corrales. She has a half-brother named Ramon Christopher Gutierrez. She is married to Philippine actor Ricky Davao. They have three children.

Blanco co-hosted the noontime show Student Canteen on GMA-7 from 1982 until the show's cancellation in 1986.  She was also a regular fixture on the Sunday musical extravaganza "GMA Supershow" on the same network.  In 1999, she became a household name when she played the main antagonist in the ABS-CBN primetime drama series "Saan Ka Man Naroroon".  Her most recent television appearances include a regular co-hosting stint in Walang Tulugan from 2008-2016, and the sitcom "Vampire Ang Daddy Ko" where she and her mother Pilita Corrales alternated for the role of Sonya Ventura as the older/younger versions.

In June 2007, she enrolled in the Associate of Arts program of the University of the Philippines, Open University. Blanco writes a column in The Philippine Star newspaper.

In the late 2000s she remained frequent with GMA-7 Afternoon dramas and Primetime dramas as well.

Filmography

Television

Television programs

Television series

Film

References

External links 
 
 

1964 births
Filipino film actresses
Filipino television actresses
Filipino child actresses
Filipino people of Spanish descent
Living people
People from Cebu City
Actresses from Cebu
Filipino women comedians
20th-century Filipino actresses
21st-century Filipino actresses
GMA Network personalities
University of the Philippines Open University alumni
Visayan people